The 1944 United States presidential election in Rhode Island took place on November 7, 1944, as part of the 1944 United States presidential election. State voters chose four electors to the Electoral College, which selected the president and vice president.

Rhode Island voted Democratic candidate, incumbent President Franklin D. Roosevelt of New York, over the Republican candidate, Governor Thomas E. Dewey of New York. Roosevelt ran with Senator Harry S. Truman of Missouri as his running mate, while Dewey ran with Governor John W. Bricker of Ohio as his running mate.

Roosevelt won the state by a margin of 17.33%.

Results

By county

See also
 United States presidential elections in Rhode Island

References

1944
Rhode Island
1944 Rhode Island elections